The Hamburg Blues Band is a German blues band, notable for its associations with prominent English musicians as invited guests and band members.

History

The Hamburg Blues Band is a German blues rock group and was founded by the singer and rhythm guitarist Gert Lange in 1982.  The original band composition was complemented for a number of years by Alex Conti on lead guitar.

Following the departure of Alex Conti, the current line-up of the Hamburg Blues Band consists of Miller Anderson on lead guitar (formerly of Keef Hartley and Savoy Brown), Gert Lange (vocals and rhythm guitar), Hans Wallbaum on drums and Michael "Bexi" Becker on the bass. Prior to Anderson becoming the band's lead guitarist, the band engaged Clem Clempson, formerly of Humble Pie, among other bands.  Becker had also been a member of Lake, a band revived by Conti in the early 2000s, while still a member of the Hamburg Blues Band.  The Hamburg Blues Band's former keyboard player, Adrian Askew, was also a member of the revived Lake.

British saxophonist Dick Heckstall-Smith (formerly Bluesbreakers and Colosseum) was an integral part of Hamburg Blues Band from its 1982 inception until his death from cancer in 2004.  Heckstall-Smith died shortly before the release of the band's album Live - On The Edge of A Knife. On this album, Heckstall-Smith was given a special memorial with his 18 minute song "Woza Nasu" ( Bring Home The Goods ).

An informal band member is songwriter Pete Brown, known for his association with Jack Bruce and Cream and the primary lyricist for "White Room" and "Sunshine of Your Love", among other songs.

A very special experience was the "Herzberg Blues Allstars" compiled in the summer of 2006 for the "Burg Herzberg Festival". The HBB formed the baseband here, opened the concert and was reinforced in the course of the evening by a lot of stars of the European blues scene. These were in particular: Chris Farlowe , Clem Clempson , Mike Harrison and Pete Brown. This was recorded on a double DVD produced by the WDR Rockpalast.

Following the departure of lead guitarist Alex Conti in spring 2008, former Humble Pie and (yet) Colosseum guitarist Clem Clempson was featured as a permanent member of the band. He left the band again in 2012 and made way for Miller Anderson . Keyboarder Adrian Askew Lake also left the band in 2012 to support Clem Clempson in his solo career. Both are already playing on the 2008 produced studio album "Mad Dog Blues", which was released in mid-January 2009. In 2011, they toured with Arthur Brown and Chris Farlowe .

In the "Friends for a LIVEtime" tour in winter / spring 2013, the trio Lange / Becker / Wallbaum continued to perform together with the guitarist Miller Anderson . As a guest vocalist, the ex- Stone the Crows singer Maggie Bell was on tour.

In 2015, the band hired young guitarist Krissy Matthews at the music festival "Musik am Noor". Since then, the band toured with him as a solid lead guitarist.

Discography

1989 Live feat. Dick Heckstall-Smith
1996 Real Stuff
1999 Rollin' 
2001 Touch - Mike Harrison Meets The HBB
2005 Live - On the Edge Of A Knife
2006 DVD: Burg Herzberg Festival 2006 (WDR Rockpalast)
2008 Mad Dog Blues
2013 Friends For A LIVEtime Vol. 1

Musical groups established in 1982
German music
Blues musical groups